The Icacinaceae, also called the white pear family, are a family of flowering plants,
consisting of trees, shrubs, and lianas, primarily of the tropics.

The family was traditionally circumscribed quite broadly, with around 55 genera totalling over 400 species. In 2001, though, this circumscription was found to be polyphyletic, and the family was split into four families in three different orders: Icacinaceae sensu stricto (then unplaced at order rank), Pennantiaceae (Apiales), Stemonuraceae (Aquifoliales) and Cardiopteridaceae (also Aquifoliales). Other genera have later been moved to Metteniusaceae (Metteniusales), so that Icacinaceae now include c. 23 genera and 160 species. One genus, Sleumeria, was described as late as 2005.

Icacinaceae belongs to the order Icacinales along with Oncothecaceae.

Icacina senegalensis extracts have shown activity against malaria parasites.

Genera
List according to Stull et al. (2015):

Icacineae
 Alsodeiopsis Oliver
 Casimirella Hassler
 Icacina A. Jussieu
 Lavigeria Pierre
 Leretia Vellozo
 Merrilliodendron Kanehira
 Pleurisanthes Baillon
Iodeae
 Iodes Blume
 †Iodicarpa Manchester
 Mappianthus Handel-Mazzetti
Mappieae
 Mappia Jacquin
 Nothapodytes Blume
Phytocreneae
 Desmostachys Miers
 Hosiea Hemsley & E. H. Wilson
 Miquelia Meisner
 Natsiatopsis Kurz
 Natsiatum Arnott
 †Palaeophytocrene Reid & Chandler
 Phytocrene Wallich
 Pyrenacantha Wight
 Rhyticaryum Beccari
 Sarcostigma Wight & Arnott
 Sleumeria Utteridge et al.
 Stachyanthus Engler
 Vadensea Jongkind & O. Lachenaud
Incertae sedis
 Cassinopsis Sonder
 †Goweria

History
In 1841, George Bentham described Apodytes and Pogopetalum as new genera and united them with Icacina, Gomphandra, and Leretia to create the tribe Icacineae of what would later be called the family Olacaceae. Olacaceae was at that time, and through the 20th century, defined broadly, encompassing several families in the order Santalales. Pogopetalum was later synonymized with Emmotum.

In 1852, John Miers argued that Bentham's Icacineae did not belong in Olacaceae and he raised them to the taxonomic rank of family as Icacinaceae.

Philippe van Tieghem realized that the family Icacinaceae, as circumscribed by Miers, consisted of groups that were only distantly related, and in 1897, he divided it into seven families. Van Tieghem's treatment in some ways anticipated the results of 21st century phylogenetic studies, in particular, by his establishment of the families Emmotaceae and Leptaulaceae. His division of Icacinaceae into smaller families was not accepted and other authors continued to define Icacinaceae in the broad sense, known as Icacinaceae sensu lato.

In 1942, Hermann Sleumer defined Icacinaceae broadly in his coverage of the family for Die Natürlichen Pflanzenfamilien. Later authors did likewise.

In the 1940s, Richard A. Howard wrote a series of papers on several of the genera. Sleumer wrote about the Asian genera in 1969, and the Malesian genera in 1971. Much of what is known about the family comes from regional floras such as Flora of Australia  and Flora of China.

In 2001, Jesper Kårehed, using a combination of morphological and DNA sequence data, showed that Icacinaceae sensu lato was distantly polyphyletic and was, at least arguably, the worst of the plant families. It is now known to have rivaled Flacourtiaceae as an unnatural assemblage of disparate groups. Kårehed divided it into four families: Pennantiaceae, Stemonuraceae, Cardiopteridaceae, and Icacinaceae sensu stricto.

Pennantiaceae consists of the single genus Pennantia and is the most basal clade in the campanulid order Apiales.

Stemonuraceae is a family of 12 genera in the campanulid order Aquifoliales. It is sister to Cardiopteridaceae.

Before the phylogeny produced by Kårehed, Cardiopteridaceae contained only Cardiopteris. Kårehed transferred Citronella, Gonocaryum, and Leptaulus from Icacinaceae to this family, and provisionally placed Metteniusa, Dendrobangia, and Pseudobotrys there as well. Metteniusa was shown to be a lamiid in 2007, and was placed in a family by itself. The affinities of Dendrobangia and Pseudobotrys remain obscure.

Some authors have continued to maintain Cardiopteridaceae as a monogeneric family, placing Citronella, Gonocaryum, Leptaulus, Dendrobangia, and Pseudobotrys in Leptaulaceae. The study by Kårehed showed Cardiopteris to be embedded in Leptaulaceae, but statistical support for this position was not strong.

Some genera have later been moved to Metteniusaceae (Metteniusales).

References

External links 

 Icacinaceae At: Angiosperm Phylogeny Website At: Missouri Botanical Garden Website
 Transactions of the Linnean Society of London 18:671 (1841)
 Annals and Magazine of Natural History, (1852)
 Bulletin de la Société Botanique de France. 1897

 
Asterid families